The Big League World Series (BLWS) West Region was one of five United States regions that sent teams to the World Series. The Big League division of Little League Baseball was discontinued after the 2016 World Series. The region's participation in the BLWS had dated back to 1968.

West Region States

 Northern California
 Southern California

Region Champions

Results by State

See also
West Region in other Little League divisions
Little League – West 1957-2000
Little League – Northwest
Little League – West
Intermediate League
Junior League
Senior League

References

Big League World Series
West
Sports in the Western United States